Lancelot Link, Secret Chimp is an American action/adventure comedy series that originally aired Saturday mornings on ABC from September 12, 1970 to January 2, 1971 and rebroadcast the following season. The live-action film series featured a cast of chimpanzees given apparent speaking roles by overdubbing with human voices.

Production
Lancelot Link, Secret Chimp had a "seven-figure budget" with location filming, props and costumes, and the laborious staging and training of the animals. The filmmakers made the most of the budget, staging multiple episodes with the same settings and wardrobe, occasionally reusing the more elaborate chase footage. Lance Link drove a 1970 Datsun Sports 2000 while villain Baron Von Butcher (and his chauffeur Creto) used a late-'50s Rolls-Royce Silver Cloud. The primates themselves rode Kawasaki MB-1 Coyote minibikes in a number of episodes.

Two of the three producers/creators were Stan Burns and Mike Marmer, former writers for Get Smart! Both resigned from their jobs as head writers on The Carol Burnett Show to work on Lancelot Link, Secret Chimp.

According to The Believer, "to make the dialogue fit the chimps’ lip action, Burns and Marmer went to ridiculous lengths. Voiceovers were ad-libbed on the set, giving birth to beautifully absurd moments of the chimps breaking into songs at the end of sentences or spontaneously reciting Mother Goose rhymes just so it would look right." Co-producer Allan Sandler explained that the writers studied the silent film footage of the chimps, and counted the syllables as the chimps' mouths moved. The writers would then shorten or lengthen the scripted lines according to the syllable count.

Plot construction
Owing considerable lineage to Get Smart, the plot was always played for laughs and featured Lancelot Link and his female colleague, "Mata Hairi," whose own name in turn was a play on Mata Hari, in secret agent and spy satires. Link and Hairi worked for A.P.E., the Agency to Prevent Evil, in an ongoing conflict with the evil organization C.H.U.M.P., the Criminal Headquarters for Underworld Master Plan (sic).

APE's chief Darwin gave Link and Hairi their orders after explaining his "theory" about each crime-in-progress, a play on the Darwin theory of ape-to-human evolution. CHUMP's monocled chief Baron von Butcher inevitably hatched the latest plan to endanger the world. The Baron's network of international bad guys included his shifty chauffeur Creto, mad scientist Dr. Strangemind, imperious Dragon Woman, drowsy Wang Fu, singing sheikh Ali Assa Seen, and the cultured Duchess. One or more of these bad guys would appear in each episode.

A regular weekly feature, during the intermission between spy stories, was chimpanzee TV host "Ed Simian" (styled as an impersonation of Ed Sullivan of the popular Ed Sullivan Show) introducing a musical number by an all-chimpanzee band, "The Evolution Revolution." The second intermission feature was "Chimpies", a short series of comedy blackouts similar to the "Crazy Shots" gags that writers Stan Burns and Mike Marmer had created for Steve Allen's TV show. The Chimpies repertoire: Freddie and Joe, two chimps in loud suits as burlesque comedians, telling riddles; Monk the Magician, a chimp producing streams of handkerchiefs and other objects from his coat; Herman and Sherman, a chimp and a miniature-chimp ventriloquist dummy; and Sneezes, showing a chimp sneezing and other chimps reacting to it.

The characters

A.P.E.
 Lancelot Link (played by Tonga, voiced by Dayton Allen imitating Humphrey Bogart). His surname is a play on 'The Missing Link'
 Mata Hairi (played by Debbie, voiced by Joan Gerber. Mata spoke in a high, whiny voice reminiscent of the Dumb Dora comediennes of the 1920s and '30s. Her name was a take-off on Mata Hari.
 Commander Darwin (voiced by Dayton Allen) - Named after Charles Darwin.
 Bruce - Official A.P.E. courier.

C.H.U.M.P.
 Baron von Butcher (voiced by Bernie Kopell) - Modeled on Kopell's character of "Siegfried" in the television show Get Smart! Kopell is believed to have approached his voicings of the Baron as if Siegfried were the head of KAOS.
 The Dragon Woman (voiced by Joan Gerber in a precise dialect) - Her name was a take-off on the Dragon Lady, a villainess in the Terry and the Pirates comic-strip series.
 Creto (voiced by Bernie Kopell) - His name was basically a play on the word "cretin." Also a play on Kato, the Green Hornet's chauffeur and crime-fighting "sidekick".
 Wang Fu (voiced by Bernie Kopell) - His name was a play on Kung Fu.
 The Duchess (voiced by Joan Gerber with cultured diction).
 Ali Assa Seen (voiced and sung by Dayton Allen) - His last name was meant to sound like "assassin."
 Dr. Strangemind (voiced by Dayton Allen impersonating Béla Lugosi) - Name inspired by Dr. Strangelove.

Additional characters
 Marty Mandrill III - Former songwriter for The Evolution Revolution turned C.H.U.M.P. spy.
 Unnamed Orangutan - Appeared in cameos as a picturesque extra. Often referred to by Lance as "that weirdo."
 Ernest Finster - English writer who was captured by C.H.U.M.P.
 Blackie - The drummer in The Evolution Revolution.
 Parnelli Smith (voice: Dayton Allen) An auto-racing champion and supplier of cars to A.P.E., his name was a take-off on former Indy 500 champion Parnelli Jones.
 Bart Sparks (voice: Bernie Kopell) Emcee of the Miss Globe beauty contest (parody of Miss America host Bert Parks).
 Raquel Wench (voice: Joan Gerber, imitating Mae West) Screen star making an appearance at the road races. Parody of Raquel Welch.
 Herman - C.H.U.M.P. henchman.

The Evolution Revolution
This all-chimp band, dressed in colorful hippie-style wigs and wardrobe, featured Lancelot Link (played by Tonga) on guitar and Mata Hairi (played by Debbie) on tambourine, with Blackie as "Bananas Marmoset" on the drums. "SweetWater Gibbons" (in fringed vest and granny glasses) was credited for playing Farfisa organ, although the organ usually pictured in the clips was a Vox Continental organ.

In the episode "The Evolution Revolution", it was established that the band's music was used to communicate coded messages for A.P.E. agents.

The songs were usually co-written and performed by Steve Hoffman, in the Bubblegum pop style then in vogue; Hoffman received "voices" credit along with the various character actors. A Lancelot Link record album was released on ABC/Dunhill, as well as a single titled "Sha-La Love You", a song originally intended for The Grass Roots; the music shared some of its style with the music of The Grass Roots, who used the same recording facilities and studio musicians.  Some songs contained heavy guitar riffs, reflecting the growth of hard rock.

An Evolution Revolution song, "Wild Dreams, Jelly Beans", was later covered by the Spanish alternative rock band Hello Lilliput.

Episodes 
The show's first-season episodes were an hour long, and also included Warner Bros. cartoon shorts from that animation studio's final years. The second season consisted of repeats from the first season with the cartoons removed.  The original network broadcast included a laugh track; this was later removed for the syndicated and video releases.

The series consisted of 17 episodes (standard practice at the time for the ABC network, allowing for each episode to be broadcast three times per year). Each episode featured two Lance Link stories, plus a band number and Chimpies sketches.

There's No Business Like Snow Business (parts one and two)
The Lone A.P.E. / Missile Beach Party
The Mysterious Motorcycle Menace / The Great Beauty Contest
C.H.U.M.P. Takes A Holiday / To Tell The Tooth
The Great Brain Drain / The Great Double Double Cross
Lance Of Arabia / The Doctor Goes A.P.E.
The Surfin' Spy / The Missing Link
Bonana / The Greatest Chase In The World
The Reluctant Robot / The Royal Foil
The Great Great Race / The Great Plane Plot
Landlubber Lance / The Temporary Thanksgiving Turkey Truce
The Dreaded Hong Kong Sneeze / The Great Bank Robbery
The Sour Taste Of Success / The Baron's Birthday Ball
The Golden Swwword / The Chilling C.H.U.M.P. Chase
The Spy Who Went Out In The Cold / Too Many C.H.U.M.P.s
The C.H.U.M.P. Code Caper / Weather Or Not
The Evolution Revolution / The Great Water Robbery

All titles were shown in the Roberta typeface in Scanimation form (except The Great Bank Robbery, where the word "bank" was eventually smash cut out).

Reception
Lancelot Link, Secret Chimp was an immediate success, spawning a wave of related merchandise including a record album, comic books, lunchboxes, and Halloween costumes. Life Magazine featured the series in a photo spread.

Syndication
Reruns aired for one season on Nickelodeon's Nick at Nite during the late 1980s; the program was also shown on Nick at Nite’s TV Land for a brief time in 1999 as part of their "Super Retrovision Saturdaze" Saturday morning-oriented overnight prime programming block. The Comedy Channel (now Comedy Central) aired reruns of this as well as Gerry Anderson stop-motion series Dick Spanner, P.I. in a block hosted by detective-themed stand-up comedian Tommy Sledge. It aired internationally in such countries as Bulgaria.

Home media
In June 2006, most of the episodes were released on a 2-DVD set by Image Entertainment.

On May 29, 2012, SBM Productions and Film Chest released the complete series on a 3-disc collector's edition. The Chimpies skits and Evolution Revolution music videos were included as separate items as well as inside the various episodes. The documentary I Created Lancelot Link was included in the bonus features, along with an interview with the original producer Allan Sandler, an interview with music composer Bob Emenegger, and a visit with Tonga, the chimp who played Lancelot in the series.

Documentary
A 1999 documentary short, I Created Lancelot Link, was made by Diane Bernard and Jeff Krulik; it includes a reunion between the show's two creators and was "shot in shlocky Hi-8 video, and [featuring] an entertaining juxtaposition of anecdotes from Burns and Marmer and some of the show's finest moments."

Print media
The fanzine Lancelot Link Fan World was published in 1975 by Cornell Kimball. Additional subjects included Sealab 2020.

References

External links
 
 TvParty page
 Evolution Revolution Album Copy provided by producer Bob Emenegger
 Lancelot Link at Grand Comics Database Lancelot Link comic books
 Lancelot Link on Amazon

1970 American television series debuts
1971 American television series endings
1970s American children's comedy television series
American Broadcasting Company original programming
American children's action television series
American children's adventure television series
English-language television shows
Espionage television series
Television shows about chimpanzees
Link Lancelot
Television series by CBS Studios
Television shows adapted into comics